An Epic No Less (sometimes stylized, An Epic, No Less) is an American Christian music band. They come from St. Louis, Missouri. The band started making music in 2009. Their membership is Todd Larson, Daniel Chancellor, Hannah Chancellor, Neil Endicott, and Brittany Stutz. The band released an independently made album, We Are the Echo of Love, in 2010. They released a studio album, Echo of Love, in 2012, with BEC Recordings.

Background
An Epic No Less is a Christian music band from St. Louis, Missouri. Their members are lead vocalist and pianist, Todd Larson, drummer, Daniel Chancellor, pianist and vocalist, Hannah Chancellor, guitarist, Neil Endicott, and violinist, Brittany Stutz.

Music history
The band commenced as a musical entity in 2009, with their first release, We Are the Echo of Love, an independent album, that was released on June 22, 2010. They released, a studio album, Echo of Love, on August 14, 2012, with BEC Recordings.

Members
Current members
 Todd Larson – vocals, piano
 Daniel Chancellor – drums
 Hannah Chancellor – piano, vocals
 Neil Endicott – guitar
 Brittany Stutz – violin

Discography
Studio albums
 Echo of Love (August 14, 2012, BEC)
Independent albums
 We Are the Echo of Love (June 22, 2010)

References

External links
 Cross Rhythms artist profile
 New Release Today artist profile

Musical groups from Missouri
2009 establishments in Missouri
Musical groups established in 2009
BEC Recordings artists